Parapsilorhynchus prateri, the Deolali minnow, is a critically endangered species of cyprinid fish currently only known from the Darna River near Deolali in Nashik District, Maharashtra, India. It is possibly extinct as it has not been recorded since 2004. Recently Nandur Madhameshwar declared a new Ramsar site in Maharashtra which provide sanctuary to the Deolali minnow.

References

Cyprinid fish of Asia
Freshwater fish of India
Taxa named by Sunder Lal Hora
Taxa named by Kamla Sankar Misra
Fish described in 1938